Ole Eiler Barndorff-Nielsen (18 March, 1935 – 26 June, 2022) was a Danish statistician who has contributed to many areas of statistical science.

Education and career 
He was born in Copenhagen, and became interested in statistics when, as a student of actuarial mathematics at the University of Copenhagen, he worked part-time at the Department of Biostatistics of the Danish State Serum Institute. He graduated from the University of Aarhus (Denmark) in 1960, where he has spent most of his academic life, and where he became professor of statistics in 1973. However, in 1962-1963 and 1963-1964 he stayed at the University of Minnesota and Stanford University, respectively, and from August 1974 to February 1975 he was an Overseas Fellow at Churchill College, Cambridge, and visitor at Statistical Laboratory, Cambridge University.

Barndorff-Nielsen became Professor Emeritus at Aarhus University at the Thiele Centre for Applied Mathematics in Natural Science and affiliated with the Center for Research in Econometric Analysis of Time Series (CREATES) on a part-time basis and since 2008 also affiliated to Institute of Advanced Studies, Technical University Munich.

Works of Barndorff-Nielsen 
Among Barndorff-Nielsen's early scientific contributions are his work on exponential families and on the foundations of statistics, in particular sufficiency and conditional inference. In 1977 he introduced the hyperbolic distribution as a mathematical model of the size distribution of sand grains, formalising heuristic ideas proposed by Ralph Alger Bagnold. He also derived the larger class of generalised hyperbolic distributions. These distributions, in particular the normal-inverse Gaussian (NIG) distribution, have later turned out to be useful in many other areas of science, in particular turbulence and finance. The NIG-distribution is now widely used to describe the distribution of returns from financial assets.

In 1984 he produced a short film on the physics of blown sand and the life of the British scientist and explorer Brigadier Ralph Alger Bagnold. A follow up to the film was produced in 2011 on the studies of stochastics in the physical sciences carried out by Barndorff-Nielsen and colleagues at the Faculty of Science, Aarhus University by the initiative of the President of the Bernoulli Society for Mathematical Statistics and Probability, Professor Victor Pérez-Abreu.

Later Barndorff-Nielsen played a leading role in the application of differential geometry to investigate statistical models. Another main contribution is his work on asymptotic methods in statistics, not least his formula for the conditional distribution of the maximum likelihood estimator given an ancillary statistic that generalizes a formula by Ronald A. Fisher (originally called the -formula, but now known as the Barndorff-Nielsen formula). He has jointly with David Cox written two influential books on asymptotic techniques in statistics. Since the mid-90s Barndorff-Nielsen has worked on stochastic models in finance (often with Neil Shephard) and turbulence, on statistical methods for the analysis of data from experiments in quantum physics, and has contributed to the theory of Lévy processes.

Notable honors and positions held 
Barndorff-Nielsen is a member of the Royal Danish Academy of Sciences and Letters and of Academia Europaea. He has received honorary doctorate degrees from the Université Paul Sabatier, Toulouse and the Katholieke Universiteit Leuven. In 1993-1995 he was a very influential president of the Bernoulli Society for Mathematical Statistics and Probability. He was the editor of International Statistical Review in 1980-1987 and of the journal Bernoulli in 1994–2000. From 1 April 1998 to 31 March 2003 he was Scientific Director of MaPhySto (the Centre for Mathematical Physics and Stochastics), which was a centre devoted to advanced research and training in the fields of mathematical physics and stochastics, as well as some closely related areas. In 2001 he received the Humboldt Prize and in 2010 the Faculty Price from Faculty of Science, Aarhus University.

Bibliography
O. E. Barndorff-Nielsen, V. K. Gupta, Victor Pérez-Abreu, and E. Waymire (eds.), Stochastic Methods in Hydrology: Rain, Landforms and Floods, World Scientific Publishing Company 1998
Ole E Barndorff-Nielsen and Albert Shiryaev, Change of Time and Change of Measure (Second Edition), World Scientific Publishing Company 2015; 1st edition 2010
Kiyosi Itô (with Ole E Barndorff-Nielsen and Ken-iti Sato as editors), Stochastic Processes: Lectures given at Aarhus University, Springer 2010
Ole E Barndorff-Nielsen, Thomas Mikosch and Sidney I. Resnick, Lévy Processes: Theory and Applications, Birkhäuser 2013; 2001 edition
Ole E. Barndorff-Nielsen, Parametric Statistical Models and Likelihood, Springer-Verlag 2012

See also 
 Generalised hyperbolic distribution
 Generalized inverse Gaussian distribution
 Hyperbolic distribution
 Information geometry
 List of mathematicians

References 

 
 Reprinted as

External links
 Barndorff-Nielsen's CV at web-site of University of Aarhus.
 Barndorff-Nielsen's page in the directory of researchers at the International Center for Scientific Research
 Photo of Barndorff-Nielsen (1998) at the web-site Portraits of Statisticians
 MaPhySto-homepage for Barndorff-Nielsen. Also contains a newer photo.
 The Centre for Mathematical Physics and Stochastics.

1935 births
2022 deaths
Members of Academia Europaea
Danish statisticians
Probability theorists

21st-century  Danish  mathematicians
Academic staff of the Technical University of Munich
University of Copenhagen alumni
Aarhus University alumni
Academic staff of Aarhus University
20th-century  Danish  mathematicians
Mathematical statisticians
People from Copenhagen